Sakuma Dam is an earthfill dam located in Chiba Prefecture in Japan. The dam is used for irrigation. The catchment area of the dam is 3 km2. The dam impounds about 16  ha of land when full and can store 1270 thousand cubic meters of water. The construction of the dam was started on 1976 and completed in 1986.

References

Dams in Chiba Prefecture
1986 establishments in Japan